Karbeh may refer to:
 Karbeh, Isfahan (كربه - Karbeh)
 Karbeh, Khuzestan (كاربح - Kārbeḩ)